The 1971 Nobel Prize in Literature was awarded to the Chilean politician and poet Pablo Neruda (1904–1973) "for a poetry that with the action of an elemental force brings alive a continent's destiny and dreams." Neruda became the second Chilean Nobel laureate in Literature after Gabriela Mistral in 1945.

Laureate

Pablo Neruda is known for his surrealist poems and historical epics which touches political, human and passionate themes. Among his well known works which are read throughout the world include Veinte poemas de amor y una canción desesperada ("Twenty Love Poems and a Song of Despair", 1924), which established him as a prominent poet and an interpreter of love and erotica, and Cien Sonetos de Amor ("100 Sonnets of Love", 1959). A diplomat, his official journey in Asia affected him strongly, which is reflected in two volumes of poems titled Residencia en la tierra ("Residence on Earth", 1933 and 1935). Neruda's Communist sympathies reflect in his work Canto General (1939), an epic poem about the whole South American continent.

Deliberations

Nominations
In 1971, the Swedish Academy received 137 nominations for 91 individuals. Neruda received 25 nominations since 1956 and received two nominations which eventually led to him being awarded the 1971 prize. Among the shortlist were Neruda, W. H. Auden, Patrick White (awarded in 1973), André Malraux and Eugenio Montale (awarded in 1975). 

The most number of nominations were for Borges and Montale, both receiving 6 nominations. André Malraux was the nominee who had been nominated for most years (22 years) up to 1971. 25 of the nominees were nominated first-time, among them Elie Wiesel (awarded the 1986 Nobel Peace Prize), José García Villa, James Baldwin, Arno Schmidt, Georges Schéhadé, William Golding (awarded in 1983) and Richard E. Kim. The oldest nominee was Jacques Maritain (aged 89) while the youngest was Richard E. Kim (aged 39). Peruvian novelist José María Arguedas was nominated posthumously by the Professor of Scandinavian languages, Elie Poulenard (1901–1985) from University of Strasbourg. Estonian poet Marie Under was the only female nominee.

The authors André Billy, C. D. Broad, Walter Van Tilburg Clark, Daniel de la Vega, Nels F. S. Ferré, Peter Fleming, Claude Gauvreau, Gaito Gazdanov, A. P. Herbert, Philippe Hériat, Raicho Hiratsuka, Ogden Nash, Allan Nevins, Reinhold Niebuhr, Naoya Shiga, Kenneth Slessor, Juhan Smuul, Aleksandr Tvardovsky, Frank Underhill, Charles Vildrac, Waldo Williams, and Philip Wylie died in 1971 without having been nominated for the prize. The Indian novelist Tarasankar Bandyopadhyay and Dutch writer Simon Vestdijk died months before the announcement.

Prize Decision

The Academy's archives later revealed in 2022 that Pablo Neruda was almost denied the Nobel Prize because of his "communist tendencies" and odes to Stalin. While Anders Österling of the Nobel committee praised Neruda's "poetic natural power and dynamic vitality", he questioned whether the increasingly dominant communist tendency in his poetry is compatible with the purpose of the Nobel prize. In the archives, Österling wrote that "a writer's way of thinking – whether Marxist, syndicalist, anarchist or something else – belongs to his free right. However, Neruda is fully politically involved, including through his hymns to Stalin and other purely propagandistic achievements. On that basis, I have reservations about his candidacy, without, however, wanting to firmly reject it in advance..." Österling had previously spoken out against the candidacy both of Ezra Pound and Samuel Beckett, but was eventually persuaded with Neruda's and Beckett's merits later awarded them the prize, but not Pound. The Nobel committee chair Karl Ragnar Gierow advocated a prize to the shortlisted British poet W.H. Auden, while Lars Gyllensten and Artur Lundkvist pushed for a prize to Neruda who won a majority of support in the Nobel committee.

Reactions
Bo Strömstedt, cultural editor of the newspaper Expressen, suggested ironically that Neruda's appointment to the Paris embassy might have been decisive factor for him being awarded the Nobel Prize in Literature, describing it as "Pension for Diplomats". In an interview, he pointed out that three laureates in the last decade had been diplomats: Saint-John Perse of France, Giorgos Seferis of Greece and Miguel Ángel Asturias of Guatemala. "I call it a Nobel old‐age pension for diplomats," he said. "I think Pablo Neruda is a great poet and a greater artist than Patrick White but like choices that come too late, it's a bit dull. I'm for choosing younger persons who are in the midst of their work."

Nobel lecture
Pablo Neruda delivered a Nobel lecture entitled "Towards the Splendid City" on 13 December 1971, in which he raises some great points about the craft of writing poetry and the poet's relation to society. Neruda expressed: "I believe that poetry is an action, ephemeral or solemn, in which there enters as equal partners solitude and solidarity, emotion and action, the nearness to oneself, the nearness to mankind and to the secret manifestations of nature."

References

External links
Award Ceremony speech nobelprize.org
Nobel diploma nobelprize.org
Banquet speech nobelprize.org

1971
Pablo Neruda